Mehta Kalu, formally Kalyan Das, (1440–1520) was the father of Guru Nanak, the founder of Sikhism. 

Kalu was born as 'Kalyan Das' to Shiv Ram Bedi and Mata Banarasi in a Hindu Khatri family of the Bedi gotra. 

He served as the patwari (accountant) of crop revenue for the village of Talwandi in the employment of the landlord, Rai Bular Bhatti.

References

Indian Sikhs
Family members of the Sikh gurus
Punjabi people
1440 births
1522 deaths